GM Europa Ovini was an Italian UCI Continental team founded in 2015. It participated in UCI Continental Circuits races.

The team was disbanded at the end of the 2017 season.

Team roster

Major wins
2015
Stage 2 Rhône-Alpes Isère Tour, Marco D'Urbano
Stage 1 Okolo Slovenska, Filippo Fortin
2016
GP Adria Mobil, Filippo Fortin
Banja Luka–Belgrade II, Filippo Fortin
Stages 1 & 5 Tour de Serbie, Filippo Fortin

References

UCI Continental Teams (Europe)
Cycling teams based in Italy
Cycling teams established in 2015
2015 establishments in Italy
Defunct cycling teams based in Italy